Eastern Cree syllabics are a variant of Canadian Aboriginal syllabics used to write all the Cree dialects from Moosonee, Ontario to Kawawachikamach on the Quebec–Labrador border in Canada that use syllabics.

Cree syllabics uses different glyphs to indicate consonants, and changes the orientation of these glyphs to indicate the vowel that follows it.  The basic principles of Canadian syllabic writing are outlined in the article for Canadian Aboriginal syllabics.

In this article, Cree words and sounds will transcribed using the Standard Roman Orthography.

Inventory
The primary difference between eastern and western Cree orthographies is the shape of the final consonants (consonant sounds with no following vowel). Eastern Cree dialects write finals with a superscripted a-syllabic. ᒫᔅᑰᒡ /māskōc/ has two finals, ᔅ /s/ and ᒡ /c/. Other differences are placing the diacritic for labialization (/w/) before rather than after the letter—ᑖᐺ /tāpwē/ (Western Cree ᑖᐻ),—and several additional series for consonants not found in Western Cree.

* The glyphs for v ([v]) \ f ([f]) and th ([ð] and [θ]) are rare and used only in words borrowed from other languages. However, the 
Inuktitut adaptation of Eastern  Cree syllabics commonly uses the Eastern Cree v \ f set as their v set.

Other finals:
 There is in Moose Cree an /sk/ final which merges into one character ᔅ /s/ and ᒃ /k/. ᐊᒥᔉ /amisk/ beaver
 The Moose Cree final /y/ is a ring written above the previous syllabic instead of the raised /ya/: ᐋᣁ /āšay/ now.
 East Cree has special finals for ᒄ /kw/ and ᒽ /mw/ which are raised versions of the o-syllabics. ᒥᔅᑎᒄ /mistikw/ tree.
 Naskapi does not mark vowel length at all and uses two dots, either placed above or before a syllable, for a w: ᐛ wa, ᐖ wo, ᑥ twa, ᒂ kwa, ᒠ cwa, ᒺ mwa, ᓏ nwa, ᔄ swa, ᔽ ywa. Since Naskapi s- consonant clusters are all labialized, sCw-, these also have the two dots: ᔌ spwa, etc. There is also a labialized final sequence, ᔊ -skw, which is a raised so-ko.

External links 
Cree syllabics at languagegeek.com Downloadable Unicode syllabics fonts and keyboard layouts for all dialects of Cree
eastcree.org Cree fonts page Fonts and keyboard layouts for East Cree
Talking syllabic chart A mapping between roman and syllabic orthographies for East Cree (audio)

Cree language
Canadian Aboriginal syllabics